Sicyonia brevirostris, the brown rock shrimp, is a species of prawn. It is found along the coasts of the western Atlantic Ocean and Gulf of Mexico from Norfolk, Virginia to Yucatán, including Cuba and the Bahamas. It is used in cooking and has a taste and texture similar to lobster. They get their name from their hard outer shell which is "hard as a rock".

Appearance 
The rock shrimp is a deepwater cousin of the pink, brown and white Gulf shrimp species (Penaeus spp.). It appears off-white to pinkish in color with the back surface darker and blotched or barred with lighter shades. Their legs are red to reddish-purple and barred with white. The abdomen has deep transverse grooves and numerous nodules. Short hairs cover their bodies and appendages. Their eyes are large and deeply pigmented.

Biology 
Brown rock shrimp's growth and development depends on factors such as water temperature and salinity. They can grow up to 6 inches in length, but most brown rock shrimp found in shallow waters are less than 2 inches long. They are highly productive and have a short life span, between 20 and 22 months.

Females are able to reproduce when they reach at least 1/2 to 1 inch in length. Males mature when they reach about 1/2 inch long. Brown rock shrimp spawn year-round in offshore waters, with peaks between November and January. Individual females can spawn three or more times in one season. Males and females mate, and the eggs are fertilized when the female simultaneously releases egg and sperm. Eggs hatch within 24 hours.

Juvenile and adult brown rock shrimp feed on the ocean floor, mainly eating small bivalve mollusks and crustaceans.

Sheepshead, minnows, water boatmen, and insect larvae eat post-larval brown rock shrimp. A wide variety of species prey on juvenile and adult brown rock shrimp.

Habitat 
Brown rock shrimp are found from Norfolk, Virginia, south through the Gulf of Mexico to Mexico's Yucatan Peninsula. They live and spawn in warm deep waters, 120 to 240 feet below the surface.

Management 
NOAA Fisheries and the South Atlantic Fishery Management Council manage the brown rock shrimp fishery.

Managed under the Shrimp Fishery Management Plan:

 Permit are required to harvest shrimp in federal waters.
 Trip reports must be submitted for each fishing trip. 
 Observers must be carried aboard selected vessels to collect data on catch, bycatch, fishing effort, and fishing gear. 
 Managers set catch levels based on historic harvest amounts and fishing rates, rather than abundance, because brown rock shrimp are short-lived and heavily influenced by environmental factors. 
 Vessels are prohibited from trawling in certain areas off Florida to protect deep water coral habitat. To ensure compliance, brown rock shrimp vessels must carry vessel monitoring systems.

Brown rock shrimp are occasionally caught in the Gulf of Mexico but not in quantities large enough to warrant specific management measures.

Status 
According to the 2018 stock assessment, brown rock shrimp is not subject to overfishing. There is currently not enough information to determine the population size, so it is unknown.

Brown rock shrimp are highly productive. Their population size varies naturally from year to year based on environmental conditions.

Notes

Other references
 Rock shrimp NOAA FishWatch. Retrieved 4 November 2012.

Dendrobranchiata
Crustaceans of the Atlantic Ocean
Crustaceans described in 1871